Thévenard is a French surname. Notable people with the surname include:

André Thévenard (1898–1952), French physician, known for Thevenard syndrome
Antoine-Jean-Marie Thévenard (1733–1815), French politician and vice admiral
Antoine-René Thévenard (1766–1798), French Navy officer
Gabriel-Vincent Thévenard (1669–1741), French opera singer
Patrice Thévenard (born 1954), French cyclist

See also
Thevenard, South Australia
Thevenard syndrome

French-language surnames